Harri Kalervo Nykänen (born 1953) is a Finnish crime writer. The film Raid is based on his work.

References 

Finnish crime writers
1953 births
Living people
Date of birth missing (living people)